Malcolm A. Love Library (commonly referred to as University Library), opened in 1971, is the primary, central academic library serving multiple campuses of  San Diego State University (SDSU) in Southern California and Northern Baja California, Mexico. Located on the Montezuma Mesa in the College Area of San Diego, California, the library underwent a major expansion to improve Library & Information Access for students institution-wide with construction of the Manchester Hall addition including a spectacular glass enclosed atrium to serve as the new entrance gateway for the University Library.  The iconic design and architecture of the new glass and steel enclosed lobby, and its stated purpose, has earned the entire complex the reference The Info Dome.

It has more than 2.2 million volumes, 4.6 million microform items, and 140,000 maps.

Library Addition
The University Library was expanded with the opening of The Info Dome in 1996, and completion of "Manchester Hall", a two-story underground addition to the library, includes a state-of-the-art Media Center, 24/7 Study Area, and two electronic classrooms.

Services

National Center for the Study of Children's Literature
In cooperation with SDSU's Department of English and Comparative Literature, the Library is the home to the National Center for the Study of Children's Literature, which recently received a $1 million gift donation by way of the Christopher D. and Karen Sickels Endowment for Special Collection in Children's Literature.

Federal Depository Library
The Library has been a selective depository library since 1962, receiving most of the items distributed by the U.S. Government Printing Office through its Federal Depository Library Program (FDLP).

State Depository Library
The Library is a complete depository library with the California State Depository Library Program.

Map library
See Map Collection
The Library's Map Collection, consists of over 135,000 sheet maps and more than 1,000 atlases and gazetteers. The collection is worldwide in scope, with an emphasis on San Diego, California, the United States of America, and Baja California. The collection has general, worldwide topographical, nautical, and aeronautical coverage. Most of the collection dates from 1945 to the present.

Special Collections
See Special Collections and University Archives
The Library's Special Collections and University Archives houses rare, fine, unique, and valuable books, periodicals, manuscripts, and documents which require security and care in handling. Other valuable historical items such as photographs, prints, postcards, memorabilia, scrapbooks, and oral histories are also held in Special Collections.
 Art collection
 Center for Regional History

Murals
NRA Packages, a mural painted in 1936 by Genevieve Burgeson Bredo, and for many years thought lost, has been restored and is on display at the foot of the Library Addition stairs. The mural was discovered in 2004 behind ceiling tiles inside SDSU's Hardy Memorial Tower, which was part of the university's first library. Painted in a variety of media, it portrays three men unloading National Recovery Act (NRA) packages from a van near San Diego's Hillcrest neighborhood. 
A second, larger mural, George Sorenson's San Diego Industry, was also restored and relocated from Hardy Tower to the Library Addition. This mural depicts the successive stages of tuna fishing and canning, along with the multi-ethnic work force involved in that industry.
See Uncovering Local Art and Industry: The Discovery of Hidden WPA-Era Murals at San Diego State University (SDSU Occasional Archeological Paper Series)
See SDSU Press Release: Exhibit promises wider exposure for legendary local painter and longtime SDSU art director

Namesake
Dr. Malcolm A. Love, Ph.D., was the fourth (4th) President of San Diego State University (SDSU), serving from 1952 to 1971. Prior to his Presidency, Dr. Love was President of the University of Nevada for two (2) years. During his nineteen (19) years as President of SDSU, he was able to transform the institution from a teacher's college into a university. In 1966, the Carnegie Corporation named Dr. Love one of the best college Presidents in the country. With the extraordinary growth of students, faculty and facilities, there were plans for new library to be named in honor of Dr. Love. The Library was dedicated to Dr. Love in May 1971.
See N.Y Times obituary for Dr. Malcolm A. Love, Ph.D.

Other Libraries at San Diego State University
Other unofficial libraries on the SDSU campus include:
 Cross-Cultural Center Library
 Science:
 Edwin C. Allison Center for Historical Science (Geology Library, research center, and collections)
 Physics Library
 Business:
 Entrepreneurial Management Center (EMC Resource Library)
 Art, Music & Dance:
 Audio-Visual Library
 Slide Library
 Career counseling:
 Career Center Library
 Career Resource Library
 Student services:
 Test Library
 Instructional services:
 The ITS Media Center collection has been transferred to the Library & Information Access

References

External links
Library website

Love Library
Love Library
Love Library
Love Library
Love Library
Library buildings completed in 1971